Zhongguan is a town in Zheng'an County, in Guizhou province, China. , it has one residential community and 6 villages under its administration.

References

Towns in Guizhou
Zheng'an County